mc - die microcomputer-zeitschrift was a monthly German microcomputer publication for technically interested persons, a bit similar to Byte magazine.

History and profile
The magazine was started in 1981. mc was published by "Franzis-Verlag GmbH". In 1996 it became a supplement for another magazine called DOS-PC (later called PC-Magazin) before it ceased to exist.

Ulrich Rohde, in Germany at the time a well known TV personality, who presented the weekly TV program WDR Computerclub, was its editor.

References

External links
 http://www.kultboy.com/MC-Zeitschrift/46/ - online scans of frontpages

1981 establishments in West Germany
1996 disestablishments in Germany
Defunct computer magazines
Defunct magazines published in Germany
Computer magazines published in Germany
German-language magazines
Monthly magazines published in Germany
Magazines established in 1981
Magazines disestablished in 1996